Raynesford is an unincorporated community in Judith Basin County, Montana, United States. Its elevation is 4,042 feet (1,232 m), and it is located at  (47.2699643, -110.7299417).  The community includes a community center, a catholic church, a fire department, and a post office.  The post office was established under the name of "Spion Kop" on March 31, 1906; its name was changed to Raynesford exactly three years later.

U.S. Route 87 passes through town. Big Otter Creek flows through town.

Demographics

Climate
According to the Köppen Climate Classification system, Raynesford has a semi-arid climate, abbreviated "BSk" on climate maps.

References

Unincorporated communities in Judith Basin County, Montana
Unincorporated communities in Montana
Populated places established in 1902